Alexey Vasilievich Naumets (Russian: Алексей Васильевич Наумец; born 11 February 1968) is a Russian Airborne Troops major general. He served with the airborne troops from 1986 and fought in the Second Chechen War and Russo-Georgian War. Naumets was severely injured in a car accident with Russian Airborne Troops commander Vladimir Shamanov in October 2010 while acting commander of the 106th Guards  Airborne Division. In February 2013, he was appointed commander of the 76th Guards Air Assault Division at Pskov. He was promoted to major general in June 2014. Naumets was placed on the European Union sanctions list in September 2014 for his command of the 76th Guards Air Assault Division in Crimea.

Military service 
Naumets graduated from the Ryazan School of Communications in 1986 and was sent to the 103rd Guards Airborne Division at Vitebsk. Naumets was involved in the suppression of the Fergana riots and the Osh riots in 1990. He served in the Second Chechen War with the 247th Air Assault Regiment. In 2005 he became chief of staff of the 104th Guards Air Assault Regiment of the 76th Guards Airborne Division. On 2 June 2007 Naumets was appointed commander of the 247th Air Assault Regiment. He led the regiment in the Russo-Georgian War, where it fought in the Battle of Kodori Gorge.  On 24 August 2009 he became chief of staff of the 106th Guards Airborne Division. Naumets became acting commander of the division in July 2010. On 31 October he was seriously injured in a car accident along with Vladimir Shamanov.  Division deputy commander Gennady Anashkin took command of the division.  After recovering from his injuries Naumets resumed duty as division chief of staff.

On 27 February 2013 Naumets was appointed commander of the 76th Guards Air Assault Division at Pskov. During the spring of 2014 the 76th Division participated in the annexation of Crimea.  On 12 June he was promoted to major general.  For his leadership of the division in Crimea, Naumets was placed on the European Union sanctions list in September 2014. He was placed on the Canadian sanctions list in February 2015. In late November 2015 Naumets was awarded the Order of Military Merit because the 76th Division was for three consecutive years considered the most efficient airborne detachment.

Personal life 
Naumets is married to Nelly and has a son, Igor.

References 

1968 births
Personnel of the Soviet Airborne Forces
Russian major generals
Russian individuals subject to European Union sanctions
Recipients of the Order of Military Merit (Russia)
Living people